Ringwood is a market town in south-west Hampshire, England, on the River Avon close to the New Forest, northeast of Bournemouth and southwest of Southampton. It was founded by the Anglo-Saxons, and has held a weekly market since the Middle Ages.

History
Ringwood is recorded in a charter of 961, in which King Edgar gave 22 hides of land in Rimecuda to Abingdon Abbey. The name is also recorded in the 10th century as Runcwuda and Rimucwuda. The second element Wuda means a 'wood'; Rimuc may be derived from Rima meaning 'border, hence "border wood." The name may refer to Ringwood's position on the fringe of the New Forest, or on the border of Hampshire. William Camden in 1607 gave a much more fanciful derivation, claiming that the original name was Regne-wood, the Regni being an ancient people of Britain.

In the Domesday Book of 1086, Ringwood (Rincvede) had been appropriated by the Crown and all but six hides taken into the New Forest. Prior to 1066 Ringwood had been held by Earl Tostig. During the 12th and early 13th centuries Ringwood, like other manors of which John and Henry III had the immediate overlordship, frequently changed hands. Thus it was held by Roland de Dinan, a Breton lord, in 1167; Robert de Beaumont, 4th Earl of Leicester before 1204; Theodoric the Teuton, a servant of King John, after 1204; William Marshal, 2nd Earl of Pembroke, in 1217, and intermittently by the third and fourth Earls up to 1237; Simon de Steyland, the King's clerk, around 1237; John son of Geoffrey, described as "of the lands of the Bretons", from 1240; Nicholas of Ely, Bishop of Winchester, from about 1272; and then by three successive queens: Queen Eleanor, Queen Margaret, and Queen Isabella, from 1280 until 1331.

In January 1331, Ringwood and other manors which Isabella had previously surrendered were granted to William Montagu, 1st Earl of Salisbury, whose descendants with some intermission held it for more than two centuries, until the death of Margaret Pole, Countess of Salisbury in 1541. It was held by Edward Seymour, 1st Duke of Somerset until his execution in 1552, and then briefly by John Gates who was executed in 1553. Queen Mary granted the lands to Francis Hastings, 2nd Earl of Huntingdon, but by the middle of the 17th century the manor had passed to the Arundells of Wardour, and in 1728 was in the hands of Henry Arundell, 6th Baron Arundell of Wardour. His grandson, the eighth Baron, sold it in 1794 to John Morant of Brockenhurst, and the Morant family held the manor throughout the 19th century.

In 1108, it was recorded that the tenants of the "manor of Ringwood and Harbridge" had common rights in the New Forest, among the knights and esquires, for their farm beasts and plough beasts between "Teg att Brokelisford" and "Ostaven" and in the vill of Beaulieu for all their livestock except goats and geese: for this they paid the King an annual agistment. A valuation of the manor made at the end of the 13th century records the tenants services included mowing the lord's meadow, haymaking on eight acres in "Muchelmershe," carting the hay and making a rick; they were to repair the mills and the houses within the court.

A mill in Ringwood is mentioned in the Domesday Book and later there were two. In March 1226 Henry III granted a weekly market in Ringwood on Wednesdays to Richard Marshal, 3rd Earl of Pembroke and Gervaise his wife to hold until the King should come of age. In 1337 the Earl of Salisbury, as lord of Ringwood Manor, was granted a yearly fair on the feast-day of Saint Andrew (30 November). There was also another fair held on the feast of Saint Peter (29 June) in the 16th century.

After the Battle of Sedgemoor on 6 July 1685, James Scott, 1st Duke of Monmouth was arrested near Horton, Dorset. Monmouth is believed to have hidden in a ditch under an ash tree disguised as a shepherd, but was betrayed by a local woman who, according to legend, later killed herself in remorse. Monmouth was then taken to the house now named Monmouth House in West Street (between the Market Place and the Fish Inn). It was there that he wrote a letter to James II begging forgiveness. This was not granted, and he was brought to trial in the Tower of London by the infamous "Hanging Judge Jefferies".

Also after the Battle of Sedgemoor, an elderly local lady, Alice Lisle, gave refuge to two wanted men who were escaping the battle. When her home, Moyles Court, (now a private school — Moyles Court School) was raided, the men were found and Alice was arrested. She was sentenced by the same Judge Jefferies to be burned at the stake; she received a late reprieve, and the sentence was reduced to beheading. She is buried at St Mary's Church, Ellingham, one mile from her Moyles Court home. Her tomb can be found to the right of the church entrance; it is easily spotted as the lid has been left unfinished with rough edges. There is now a pub called the Alice Lisle near Moyles Court.

The Town Hall was erected by John Morant in 1868. The town was famous in the 19th century for its "Ringwood" woollen gloves, and there was also a large linen collar and cuff factory here.

The site of Royal Air Force Station Ibsley, in use during World War II, is located on the outskirts of the Ringwood hamlet of Poulner. This site has later been used for motor-racing as Ibsley Circuit and today is a quarry lake area.

Geography
Ringwood is a town on the east bank of the River Avon in Hampshire. The parish includes the hamlets of Poulner, Hangersley, Hightown, Crow, Kingston, and Bisterne.

Economy
Ringwood has a weekly market in the traditional market place. A cattle market ran until 1989 in the Furlong, which is now home to a Waitrose supermarket, coffee shops and fashion outlets. Ringwood was noted as the second most expensive market town in England in July 2008 with average property prices of over £380,000.

Ringwood is the home of the Ringwood Brewery, which produces a variety of cask ales and runs five pubs in the local area, such as the Inn on the Furlong in Ringwood. Ringwood brewery also produces a variety of wines. It was taken over by Marston's Brewery, who plan to keep the brewery and all its brands, but lease out its tied public houses.

Politics
Ringwood is within the New Forest West parliamentary constituency. The current Member of Parliament (MP) is Sir Desmond Swayne who represents the Conservative Party. Ringwood is represented by one councillor on Hampshire County Council and five councillors on New Forest District Council. All of these are currently held by the Conservative Party.

Ringwood Town Council formed in 1974 and serves an estimated 14,000 people. The town is divided into three wards. The Councillors elect a Mayor every two years who is also the chairman of the council. The current Mayor of Ringwood is Gareth Deboos. The council, which is elected every four years, has 14 councillors: nine Conservative Party, three Labour and two Independent. Ringwood Town Council provide a variety of services and amenities for the town, including allotments, the cemetery, recreation grounds some public open spaces, the running of events, and a youth service. The council is based in the Ringwood Gateway building on The Furlong in the town centre.

Ringwood was the birthplace of British communist leader and anti-fascist Bill Alexander, who was present at the Battle of Cable Street and commanded the British Battalion near the end of the Spanish Civil War.

Education
The senior school is Ringwood School, a national teaching academy. The state primary schools are Ringwood Junior, Poulner Junior, Ringwood CofE Infants and Poulner Infants. There is also a Waldorf school, the Ringwood Waldorf School a centre for Steiner Education for ages 3 to 18 years with around 260 pupils. The Ringwood Waldorf school is near a Camphill community. Ringwood also has an independent 3–16-day and boarding school called Moyles Court School.

Sport and leisure
Ringwood has a Non-League football club Ringwood Town F.C., which plays at Long Lane.

Ringwood is home to Ellingham and Ringwood Rugby Club who play at Parsonage Barn Lane. They run 3 senior sides, a women's side and all mini and junior ages. There are also two Cricket clubs, Ringwood Cricket Club who play at Carvers Recreation Ground and Ellingham Cricket Club who play at Picket Post.

Speedway has been staged at nearby Matchams Park. The team, known as the Ringwood Turfs, featured in the Southern Area League in the mid-1950s. There is also a long-standing and active Judo club

Ringwood has a Sailing Club, the Spinnaker Club, based on Blashford Lake in Ivy Lane, about 1 mile North from the town centre. A number of academic institutions (3 Universities, 3 Schools) and Sailability are affiliated. The club has a racing programme for several classes of sailing dinghy, for adults and children, and a programme for training for various levels of competence and experience. Many sailors from this Club have had championship success, nationally and internationally, and the club has been successful in Teams Sailing, winning the National Champs, and The British Open many times.

Millstream Model Centre & Raceway is the UK's largest slotcar racing centre.

Transport

Road
The main road through Ringwood is the A31, which runs west to Dorchester and east to Southampton via the New Forest. A bypass of the town was completed in two stages; the first to the west in the 1940s and the second to the east in 1975. The other significant road is the A338, which goes north to Salisbury and south to Bournemouth.

Rail

Ringwood railway station opened in 1847. It lay on the Southampton and Dorchester Railway. In 1862 the Ringwood, Christchurch and Bournemouth Railway created a new link with Christchurch. The line to Christchurch was closed in 1935, and the station ceased operating when the Southampton and Dorchester Railway line was closed in 1964. A report (Connecting Communities: Expanding Access to the Rail Network) from the Association of Train Operating Companies in 2009 recommended rebuilding part of the line from Brockenhurst to Ringwood.

Church of St Peter and St Paul
A church in Ringwood is mentioned in the Domesday Book of 1086. It was rebuilt in the 13th century and survived until 1853, when it was completely knocked down and rebuilt. The church contains a 15th-century monumental brass of John Prophete, Dean of Hereford and York.

Filming location
The swimming pool, sports hall and exterior scenes of the BBC television comedy series The Brittas Empire were filmed at Ringwood Health and Leisure Centre, at the time known as Ringwood Recreation Centre.

Areas
Northbound
Salisbury
Fordingbridge
New Forest
Southampton

Southbound
 Ferndown
 Bournemouth Airport
 Christchurch
 Bournemouth
 Poole

Twin towns

Ringwood is twinned with:

 Pont-Audemer, France

References

External links

Ringwood Town Council

 
Towns in Hampshire
Civil parishes in Hampshire
New Forest District